Paul Mullin may refer to:

 Paul Mullin (footballer, born 1974), English footballer
 Paul Mullin (footballer, born 1994), English footballer for Wrexham

See also
 Paul Mullen (born 1982), English musician
 Paul Mullen (rugby union) (born 1991), Irish-American rugby union player